Dighalia Union is an Union Parishad under Lohagara Upazila of Narail District in the division of Khulna, Bangladesh. It has an area of 30.33 km2 (11.71 sq mi) and a population of 27,444.

References

Unions of Lohagara Upazila, Narail
Unions of Narail District
Unions of Khulna Division